The Latin Grammy Award for Best Traditional Pop Vocal Album is an award presented at the Latin Grammy Awards since 2012. The award replaced the previous awards for Best Female Pop Vocal Album, Best Male Pop Vocal Album and Best Pop Album by a Duo or Group with Vocals. According to the Latin Grammy category definitions, it is designed "For albums containing 51% or more playing time of newly recorded (previously unreleased) material and 51% playing time of Traditional Pop music. Albums must also contain 51% or more playing time of vocal tracks. For solo artists, duos or groups."

The albums Tanto by Pablo Alborán, Natalie Cole en Español by Natalie Cole, Orígenes: El Bolero Volumen 3 by Café Quijano, Prometo by Pablo Alborán has been nominated for both this award and Album of the Year. The albums Lo Mejor Que Hay En Mi Vida by Andrés Cepeda and Sinfónico by Fonseca and the National Symphony Orchestra of Colombia won this award were also nominated for Album of the Year. Los Dúo 2 by Juan Gabriel became the first album to win both awards.

Winners and nominees

2010s

2020s

See also
Latin Grammy Award for Best Contemporary Pop Vocal Album

References

External links
Official site of the Latin Grammy Awards

 
Traditional Pop Vocal Album